The Aero Design DG-1 (registered N10E) is an American racing aircraft designed by David Garber in an attempt to break the world airspeed record for a piston-engined aircraft. It is a single-seat aircraft with two Mazda RX-3 engines installed, one driving a tractor propeller, the other driving a pusher. The fuselage is bullet-shaped and highly streamlined and features a mid-wing and cruciform tail. It first flew on 25 July 1977.

After being displayed at the Sun 'n Fun air museum at Lakeland, Florida for some years, the aircraft was being offered for sale in 2005 with an asking price of $125,000 (USD).

Specifications (Aero Design DG-1)

References

 Taylor, J. H. (ed) (1989) Jane's Encyclopedia of Aviation. Studio Editions: London. p. 27
 Aerofiles
 Aero Trader, October 2005
 Air Progress, June 1975 
 Sport Aviation, March 1976 
 Sport Aviation, February 2002, p. 44–49

External links
 Mazda Wankel Rotary Engines for Aircraft Website has a photo of the partially dismantled airframe and a three-view drawing of the complete aircraft.

Aero Design Associates aircraft
Twin-engined push-pull aircraft
1970s United States sport aircraft
Wankel-engined aircraft
Mid-wing aircraft
Aircraft first flown in 1977